Tandala Airport  is an airport serving the town of Tandala in Sud-Ubangi Province, Democratic Republic of the Congo.

See also

 Transport in the Democratic Republic of the Congo
 List of airports in the Democratic Republic of the Congo

References

External links
 FallingRain - Tandala
 OpenStreetMap - Tandala
 HERE Maps - Tandala
 OurAirports - Tandala
 

Airports in Sud-Ubangi